White Lake Water Aerodrome  is located on White Lake,  south of White Lake, Ontario, Canada.

References

Transport in Renfrew County
Registered aerodromes in Algoma District
Seaplane bases in Ontario